The 2018 West Nusa Tenggara gubernatorial election took place on 27 June 2018 as part of the simultaneous local elections. It was held to elect the governor of West Nusa Tenggara alongside their deputy, whilst members of the provincial council (Dewan Perwakilan Rakyat Daerah) will be re-elected in 2019.

With incumbent Muhammad Zainul Majdi meeting his term limits, People's Representative Council member Zulkieflimansyah came ahead in the four-candidate race, defeating regents of Central Lombok and East Lombok Mohammad Suhaili Fadhil Thahir and Ali Bin Dahlan, alongside Mataram mayor Ahyar Abduh, winning 31.8 percent of votes.

Timeline
Registration for party-backed candidates were opened between 8 and 10 January 2018, while independent candidates were required to register between 22 and 26 November 2017. The numerical order of the candidates were determined on 13 February through a lottery. The campaigning period commenced between 15 February and 24 June, with a three-day election silence before voting on 27 June.

Candidates

Results

References

West Nusa Tenggara
2018 Indonesian gubernatorial elections